Chloé is a 1996 French-Belgian TV drama film directed by Dennis Berry starring Marion Cotillard in the title role, a 16-year-old girl who is forced by her boyfriend to become a prostitute. The film features Édith Piaf's song "La Vie en Rose" performed by Louis Armstrong. Years later, Marion Cotillard won an Oscar for playing Piaf in the 2007 film La Vie en Rose.

Cast
 Marion Cotillard as Chloé
 Anna Karina as Katia
 Jean-Claude Adelin as Jean-Michel
 Nozha Khouadra as Elsa
 Arache Mansour as Ahmed
 Elisabeth von Buxhoeveden as Juliette
 Caroline Pevée as Séverine
 Olivier Polgen as Thomas
 Jean-Marie Gelon as Le PDG
 Anne Deleuze as La mère

References

External links
 

1996 films
1996 drama films
French drama films
Belgian drama films
1990s French-language films
Films set in France
Films about prostitution in France
French television films
Drama television films
Belgian television films
1990s French films